GM Building may refer to:
Cadillac Place in Detroit, commonly known as the GM Building
General Motors Building (New York), commonly known as the GM Building
GM Building (Mobile)